Walter Lang (August 10, 1896 – February 7, 1972) was an American film director.

Early life
Walter Lang was born in Tennessee. As a young man he went to New York City where he found clerical work at a film production company. The business piqued his artistic instincts and he began learning the various facets of filmmaking and eventually worked as an assistant director. However, Lang also had ambitions to be a painter and left the United States for a time to join the great gathering of artists and writers in the Montparnasse Quarter of Paris, France. Things did not work out as Lang hoped and he eventually returned home and to the film business.

Career
In 1925, Walter Lang directed his first silent film, The Red Kimono. In the mid-1930s, he was hired by 20th Century Fox where, as a director, he "painted" a number of the spectacular colorful musicals for which Fox Studios became famous for producing during the 1940s. One of Lang's most recognized films is the lavish adaptation of Rodgers and Hammerstein's musical The King and I (1956) for which he was nominated for the Academy Award for Directing. and his star, Yul Brynner, won the Oscar for Best Actor in a role he immortalized.  Another is State Fair, also a Rodgers and Hammerstein classic, which was shown to WW2 servicemen around the world in the last months of the war.

For his contribution to the motion picture industry, Walter Lang has a star on the Hollywood Walk of Fame at 6520 Hollywood Blvd.

Personal life
Lang was married to Madalynne Field (1907–1974) from 1937 until his death. Field, a former actress, had met and befriended Carole Lombard when they were employed as Sennett Bathing Beauties in the late 1920s. Field's film career ended with the demise of Sennett's studio. However, she maintained her friendship with Lombard, and acted as Lombard's secretary until her marriage. She met Lang when he directed Lombard in Love Before Breakfast (1936). Lang was buried in the Inglewood Park Cemetery, in Inglewood, California.

Filmography

 The Red Kimono (1925)
 The Earth Woman (1926)
 The Golden Web (1926)
 Money to Burn (1926)
 The Ladybird (1927)
 The Satin Woman (1927)
 Sally in Our Alley (1927)
 By Whose Hand? (1927)
 The College Hero (1927)
 The Night Flyer (1928)
 Alice Through a Looking Glass (1928)
 The Desert Bride (1928)
 The Spirit of Youth (1929)
 Hello Sister (1930)
 Cock o' the Walk (1930)
 The Big Fight (1930)
 The Costello Case (1930)
 Brothers (1930)
 Command Performance (1931)
 Hell Bound (1931)
 Women Go on Forever (1931)
 No More Orchids (1932)
 The Warrior's Husband (1933)
 Meet the Baron (1933)
 Whom the Gods Destroy (1934)
 The Party's Over (1934)
 The Mighty Barnum (1934)
 Carnival (1935)
 Hooray for Love (1935)
 Love Before Breakfast (1936)
 Top of the Town (1937)
 Wife, Doctor and Nurse (1937)
 Second Honeymoon (1937)
 The Baroness and the Butler (1938)
 I'll Give a Million (1938)
 The Little Princess (1939)
 Susannah of the Mounties (1939)
 The Blue Bird (1940)
 Star Dust (1940)
 The Great Profile (1940)
 Tin Pan Alley (1940)
 Moon Over Miami (1941)
 Week-End in Havana (1941)
 Song of the Islands (1942)
 The Magnificent Dope (1942)
 Coney Island (1943)
 Greenwich Village (1944)
 State Fair (1945)
 Claudia and David (1946)
 Sentimental Journey (1946)
 Mother Wore Tights (1947)
 Sitting Pretty (1948)
 When My Baby Smiles at Me (1948)
 You're My Everything (1949)
 Cheaper by the Dozen (1950)
 The Jackpot (1950)
 On the Riviera (1951)
 With a Song in My Heart (1952)
 Call Me Madam (1953)
 There's No Business Like Show Business (1954)
 The King and I (1956)
 Desk Set (1957)
 But Not for Me (1959)
 Can-Can (1960)
 The Marriage-Go-Round (1961)
 Snow White and the Three Stooges (1961)

References

External links

 

1896 births
1972 deaths
20th Century Studios people
People from Memphis, Tennessee
Deaths from kidney failure
Burials at Inglewood Park Cemetery
Film directors from Tennessee